Lee Young-ji (born September 10, 2002) is a South Korean rapper. She is the winner of High School Rapper 3 and Show Me the Money 11.

Philanthropy
On August 11, 2022, Lee donated  million to help those affected by the 2022 South Korean floods through the Hope Bridge Korea Disaster Relief Association.

Discography

Singles

Filmography

Television series

Television shows

Web shows

Awards and nominations

Notes

References

2002 births
Living people
South Korean women rappers
South Korean hip hop singers
21st-century South Korean women singers
Show Me the Money (South Korean TV series) contestants